Winter Haven's Gilbert Airport  is a city-owned, public-use airport located three nautical miles (6 km) northwest of the central business district of Winter Haven, a city in Polk County, Florida, United States. It is owned by the City of Winter Haven. It is also known as Winter Haven Regional Airport or Gilbert Field. Jack Browns Seaplane Base is located adjacent to the airport, connected by a taxiway.

History
During World War II, Gilbert Field was an auxiliary airfield for the Lakeland (later Lodwick) School of Aeronautics at the Lakeland Lodwick Field airport. The school provided basic pilot training to United States Army Air Forces and British Royal Air Force flying cadets from the airfield under contract. Flight training was performed until the end of the war.

Facilities and aircraft 
It has two asphalt paved runways: 5/23 is 5,005 by 100 feet (1,526 x 30 m) and 11/29 is 4,001 by 60 feet (1,220 x 18.29 m).

For the 12-month period ending November 17, 2009, the airport had 60,000 general aviation aircraft operations, an average of 164 per day. At that time there were 158 aircraft based at this airport: 87% single-engine, 9% multi-engine, 1% jet and 2% glider.

Accidents and Incidents
Four people were killed on March 7, 2023, when a Piper PA-28 Cherokee and a Piper PA-18 Super Cub collided on approach to runway 29 at Gilbert Field.

See also

 Florida World War II Army Airfields

References

External links 
 Winter Haven Air Services , the fixed-base operator (FBO)
 Aerial photo as of 6 January 1999 from USGS The National Map
 

1943 establishments in Florida
Airports established in 1943
USAAF Contract Flying School Airfields
Airports in Polk County, Florida
Airfields of the United States Army Air Forces in Florida
Buildings and structures in Winter Haven, Florida